The Hays Daily News is a newspaper that serves western Kansas.  The Daily News is published every day except Saturday.  In 2011, the paper reported a circulation of 9,644 subscribers.

Harris Enterprises, based in Hutchinson, Kansas, purchased the Daily News in 1970. In November 2016, GateHouse Media purchased the Daily News and the other Harris properties for $20 million. In September 2021 "CherryRoad Media" purchased "Hays Daily News" along with 19 other newspapers in 4 different states.

See also
 List of newspapers in Kansas

References

External links
 Hays Daily News home page

Newspapers published in Kansas